Penicillium panamense is a species of fungus in the genus Penicillium which produces vermicellin.

References

Further reading 
 

panamense
Fungi described in 1989